The 2014 Oceania Athletics Championships were held at the BCI Stadium in Avarua, Rarotonga, Cook Islands, between June 24–26, 2014.  The event was held jointly with the 2014 Oceania Junior Athletics Championships, and there were also exhibition events for masters, and athletes with a disability (parasports).  Detailed reports on a day by day basis were given.

In the senior category, a total of 39 events were contested, 19 by men, 19 by women and 1 mixed medley relay.

Medal summary
Complete results can be found on the Oceania Athletics Association webpage.

Men

Women

Mixed

Medal table (unofficial)

Participation
According to an unofficial count, 155 athletes from 21 countries participated in the senior category.  As in the years before, there was also a "Regional Australia Team" (dubbed "RAT" in the results list) including athletes with "their normal place of residence in Northern Australia (defined as comprising the Northern Territory and any parts of Western Australia and Queensland, north of 26th parallel south latitude)."

 (28)
 (10)
 (9)
 (6)
 (7)
 (4)
 (1)
 (1)
 (6)
 (1)
 (11)
 (4)
 (1)
/ North Australia (17)
 (1)
 (5)
 (21)
 (5)
 (5)
 (7)
 (5)

References

Oceania Athletics Championships
Athletics in the Cook Islands
Oceania Athletics Championships
Oceania Athletics Championships
International sports competitions hosted by the Cook Islands
June 2014 sports events in Oceania